Tomislav Stipić (born 1 August 1979) is a Croatian-German professional football manager currently serving as the head coach of the Latvian Higher League club Riga.

Personal life
Stipić was born in Tomislavgrad, SR Bosnia and Herzegovina, back then part of SFR Yugoslavia. Aged ten, he moved with his mother and seven siblings as refugee to Germany. His father had already lived in Germany since 1968.

Coaching career
He managed the youth team and the reserve team of Ingolstadt 04. On 9 September 2014, he signed a two-year contract to replace Falko Götz at Erzgebirge Aue. He was sacked on 27 May 2015.

He was appointed as head coach of the Stuttgarter Kickers on 4 November 2015.

On 9 April, Grasshoppers announced the release of Stipić after 34 days in charge.

On 8 October 2019, Stipić was appointed as head coach of the  Croatian club Slaven Belupo. He left the club on 16 June 2021.

On 1 January 2022, Stipić joined the Latvian club FK Auda. On 19 october 2022, he led his club to the 2022 Latvian Football Cup for the first time in history.

On 7 January 2023, Stipić was appointed manager of Riga.

Managerial statistics

Honours

Manager
 FK Auda
 Latvian Cup : 2022

References

External links
Profile at scoreway.com

1979 births
German people of Croatian descent
Croatian football managers
German football managers
Living people
People from Tomislavgrad
2. Bundesliga managers
3. Liga managers
Latvian Higher League managers
FC Erzgebirge Aue managers
Stuttgarter Kickers managers
German expatriate football managers
Croatian expatriate football managers
Latvian expatriate football managers
Expatriate football managers in China
Expatriate football managers in Latvia
German expatriate sportspeople in China
Croatian expatriate sportspeople in China
Nantong Zhiyun F.C. managers
Grasshopper Club Zürich managers
NK Slaven Belupo managers
Riga FC managers